SpringHill Suites is a brand operated by Marriott International offering all-suite hotels that target the upper-moderate lodging tier of the industry. As of June 30, 2020, it has 470 hotels with 55,595 rooms in addition to 187 hotels with 21,307 rooms in the pipeline.

History
Introduced in May 1997, the concept arose out of rebranding former Fairfield Suites properties which featured an all-suite layout into a brand of its own. These featured a bedroom, living area and kitchen. Rooms included a microwave, small refrigerator, iron and hair dryer. The hotel’s breakfast buffet, and fax and copy services were complimentary. Growing from 34 properties (six managed and 28 franchised) in 1999, 153 operated by 2006. The 300th opened in 2013.

Accommodations

Historical

From 2015

Awards 
2012
 SpringHill Suites was ranked #1 in the J.D. Power and Associates Guest Satisfaction Survey in the upscale category in a tie with Hilton Garden Inn.
 SpringHill Suites Chicago O'Hare was awarded Best Value for Money: O'Hare Airport Award, 2012 Hotel Awards, ChicagoHotels.org
2013 
 McGarryBowen was awarded a Digital Marketing Platinum Adrian Award by the Hospitality Sales and Marketing Association International for the "Everywhere" video campaign produced for SpringHill Suites.
2014
 McGarryBowen was awarded an Advertising Platinum Adrian Award for the Airport Comfort Zones campaign produced for SpringHill Suites.
 Ranked Top Ten on Forbes 2014 Best Franchises in America (over $500k)
2015
 The Gold Award, The Internationalists — Innovation in Media, SpringHill Suites, Comfort Zones
 Business Travel News second place award in the Upper Moderate category
 Ranked #3 in Parents magazine "10 Best Hotels for Families 2015"
2016
 Ranked #3 for Budget in Parents magazine "10 Best Hotels for Families 2016"
 Ranked Top 10 on Forbes America’s Best Franchises to Buy in 2016 (over $500K)

References

Hotels established in 1999
Marriott International brands
1999 establishments in the United States